William Davie House may refer to:

William Davie House (American Falls, Idaho), listed on the National Register of Historic Places (NRHP) in Power County
William R. Davie House, Halifax, North Carolina, NRHP-listed in Halifax County

See also 

Davies House (disambiguation)